DOS is shorthand for the MS-DOS and IBM PC DOS family of operating systems.

DOS may also refer to:

Computing
 Data over signalling (DoS), multiplexing data onto a signalling channel
 Denial-of-service attack (DoS), an attack on a communications network
 Disk operating system
 List of disk operating systems, Apple DOS, Atari DOS, DOS/360, etc.
 Distributed operating system

Music

Albums
 Dos (Altered State album)
 Dos (Dos album)
 Dos (Fanny Lú album)
 Dos (Gerardo album)
 Dos (Malo album), 1972
 Dos (Myriam Hernández album), 1989
 Dos, album by Wooden Shjips, 2009
 ¡Dos!, album by Green Day

Other uses in music
 Dos (band), an American band
 DOS (concert), by Filipino singer Daniel Padilla

Organisations
 Democratic Opposition of Serbia, a former political alliance
 Department of Space, India
 Deutscher Olympischer Sportbund
 Directorate of Overseas Surveys, UK 1957–1984
Dominus Obsequious Sororium, within cult NXIVM
 United States Department of State

Places
 Dos, a village in Vidra Commune, Romania

Science
 Density of states in physics
 DOS-1 etc., Russian space station designation in the Salyut programme
 Dioctyl sebacate, an organic chemical
 Diversity oriented synthesis in chemistry

Sports
 DOS Kampen, a Dutch football club
 VV DOS, a past Dutch football club now part of FC Utrecht

Other uses
 Dos (card game), a variation of Uno
 Dos, an Ancient Roman dowry
 Day of Silence, an LGBT observance

See also
 
 
 Doss (disambiguation)